Philipp D. Woolpert (December 15, 1915 – May 5, 1987) was an American basketball coach, best known as the head coach of the University of San Francisco Dons in the 1950s. He led them to consecutive national championships in 1955

Biography
Born in Danville, Kentucky, Woolpert was raised in Los Angeles, graduating from Manual Arts High School in 1933, in the depths of the Great Depression.  L.A. Junior College and Loyola University, where he played basketball for three years, was initiated into the Alpha Delta Gamma fraternity, and graduated in 1940 with a degree in 

In 1946, Woolpert was hired as basketball coach for St. Ignatius College Preparatory in San Francisco, where he posted a  record in his four years as coach. Upon Pete Newell's departure for Michigan State University, the University of San Francisco hired Woolpert to succeed Newell. He assumed both the posts of men's basketball coach and athletic director.

During his tenure at USF, Woolpert posted a  record, including a 60-game win streak that at the time was the longest in college basketball, surpassed later by John Wooden's 88 straight wins at UCLA. Woolpert's teams, anchored by Bill Russell, K. C. Jones, Gene Brown, and Mike Farmer, were known for their defense and held opponents below 60 points on 47 different occasions. USF won the NCAA tournament in 1955 and 1956, and finished third in 1957. At the time the youngest college basketball coach to win a national championship, Woolpert also won Coach of the Year honors in 1955 and 1956.

After briefly coaching the San Francisco Saints of the American Basketball League, Woolpert returned to the college ranks in 1962, this time with the University of San Diego. While at USD, Woolpert posted a  record and served as both men's basketball coach and athletic director.

Woolpert retired from coaching in 1969, and later settled down on the Olympic Peninsula in Washington and became a school bus driver  He died of lung cancer at age 71 at his home 

Woolpert's son Paul was the assistant coach of the G-League South Bay Lakers.

Head coaching record

College

See also
 List of NCAA Division I Men's Final Four appearances by coach

References

External links
 
 Sports-Reference – Phil Woolpert
 

1915 births
1987 deaths
American Basketball League (1961–62) coaches
American men's basketball coaches
American men's basketball players
Basketball coaches from Kentucky
Basketball players from Kentucky
Deaths from cancer in Washington (state)
High school basketball coaches in the United States
Los Angeles City Cubs men's basketball players
Loyola Marymount Lions men's basketball players
Naismith Memorial Basketball Hall of Fame inductees
National Collegiate Basketball Hall of Fame inductees
People from Danville, Kentucky
People from Sequim, Washington
San Diego Toreros athletic directors
San Diego Toreros men's basketball coaches
San Francisco Dons athletic directors
San Francisco Dons men's basketball coaches